Horridipamera nietneri is a species of dirt-colored seed bug in the family Rhyparochromidae, found in Indomalaya.

References

Rhyparochromidae